John P. Lockney (March 17, 1867, date of death unknown) was an American actor of the silent film era. He appeared in more than 100 films between 1915 and 1937. He was born in Philadelphia, Pennsylvania.

Partial filmography

 The Bride of Hate (1917)
 The Crab (1917)
 The Gunfighter (1917)
 The Tar Heel Warrior (1917)
 Polly Ann (1917)
 Flying Colors (1917)
 Flare-Up Sal (1918)
 The Guilty Man (1918)
 Fuss and Feathers (1918)
 Partners Three (1919)
 The Sheriff's Son (1919)
 The Egg Crate Wallop (1919)
 The Family Honor (1920)
 Below the Surface (1920)
 A Broadway Cowboy (1920)
 Dice of Destiny (1920)
 Uncharted Channels (1920)
 Down Home (1920)
 The Face of the World (1921)
 Hickville to Broadway (1921)
 Partners of the Tide (1921)
 See My Lawyer (1921)
 The Kiss (1921)
 Rose o' the Sea (1922)
 Just Tony (1922)
 The Bootlegger's Daughter (1922)
 Seeing's Believing (1922)
 Making a Man (1922)
 The Prisoner (1923)
 Main Street (1923)
 McGuire of the Mounted (1923)
Danger Ahead (1923)
 The Dixie Handicap (1924)
 Thundering Romance (1924)
 The Virgin (1924)
 Barriers Burned Away (1925)
 Where the Worst Begins (1925)
 Double Action Daniels (1925)
 The Desperate Game (1926)
 The Windjammer (1926)
 Twisted Triggers (1926)
 Double Daring (1926)
 Sweet Adeline (1926)
 Hearts and Spangles (1926)
 Heroes of the Night (1927)
 Galloping Thunder (1927)
 The Return of Boston Blackie (1927)
 Born to Battle (1927)
 Soda Water Cowboy (1927)
 The American (1927) (not released)
 Vultures of the Sea (1928)
 The Flyin' Buckaroo (1928)
 Smoke Bellew (1929)
 The Voice from the Sky (1930)

References

External links

1867 births
American male film actors
American male silent film actors
Year of death missing
20th-century American male actors
Male actors from Philadelphia
Date of death unknown